Nick Bolkus (born 17 July 1950) is a former Australian Labor Party politician. He was a member of the Senate from July 1981 to June 2005, representing the state of South Australia.

Early career
Bolkus was born in Adelaide and educated at Adelaide High School and the University of Adelaide. He was very briefly a lawyer in 1974 and 1975 before moving into political advising as a research officer for a number of Australian Labor Party (ALP) members including Clyde Cameron. He unsuccessfully ran for the district of Torrens at the 1975 state election and for the Senate at the 1977 federal election. He entered politics as a Senator for South Australia following the 1980 Australian federal election.

Parliamentary career

Bolkus stayed on the back bench for his first seven years in Parliament. Bolkus was eventually promoted to the outer Ministry as Minister for Consumer Affairs and Minister Assisting the Treasurer for Prices (1988–90). Bolkus became a Cabinet Minister for five years, as Minister for Administrative Services (1990–93) (a Ministry which was later relegated out of Cabinet), and then Minister for Immigration and Ethnic Affairs and Minister Assisting the Prime Minister for Multicultural Affairs (1993–96).

After the end of the Keating Government (due to its election defeat in 1996), Bolkus was a member of the Opposition Shadow Ministry from March 1996 to November 2001. He remained on the back bench for the final four years of his career in Parliament.

Minister for Consumer Affairs, Minister for Assisting for Prices 1988–90

Bolkus was first elected to the Federal Ministry in February 1988 as Minister for Consumer Affairs and Minister Assisting the Treasurer for Prices.
In this portfolio he introduced world leading legislation to protect the privacy of individuals in their relationships with credit data agencies. He was also responsible for introducing the Banking Ombudsman, streamlining National Uniform Food Laws, introducing a series of Codes of Conduct protecting consumers, and initiating enquiries into the pricing practices of the computer software, music and book industries.

Minister for Administrative Services 1990–93

Bolkus  was appointed to Cabinet in 1990 as Minister for Administrative Services, a portfolio which he held until the 1993 election.
In this portfolio he introduced comprehensive legislation for the disclosure of political donations. He was also responsible for the transition of the Department to a commercialized, corporatized and competitive body. Bolkus drove a structural reform agenda which radically reformed the supply of services to Government. The Agenda commercialized much of the Government's construction and supply facilities. It was managed without a day lost to industrial action. At the same time, he used the extensive reach of a department which had responsibility in such areas as Commonwealth property ownership, construction, purchasing and the Australian Electoral Commission, to pursue the government's environmental and industry policy agenda, particularly in the Information Technology area.

Minister for Immigration and Ethnic Affairs 1993–96

In 1993 Bolkus was appointed Minister for Immigration and Ethnic Affairs and Minister Assisting the Prime Minister for Multicultural Affairs. He held these portfolios until the 1996 election. In these positions, Bolkus drove a reform agenda which aimed at making both the Department's and Government's immigration, refugee and multicultural policies more relevant to Australia's social, economic and humanitarian needs. Most importantly, he drove a major restructure of the Department.

Reforms were implemented in Australia's economic migration infrastructure.

The achievements of this 3-year period include a restructure of both the Department and policy, including:
 rewriting Australia's Migration laws
 recognition of the importance of temporary business entry through initiatives such as the APEC card "invisible visa" entry for Tourism, and the Business "life of passport" visa
 fundamental  restructuring of the business migration program
 the first review of the Australian Citizenship Act since its 1948 introduction
 the establishment of the Refugee Review Tribunal
 the revision of Australia's Oath and Allegiance by removing reference to the Queen
 the introduction of a major Citizenship Promotion program
 increase in the annual migration and refugee programs

Bolkus has been an advocate of a non-discriminatory migration program and multiculturalism. These issues were among his main reasons for joining the Australian Labor Party in 1966. In Government, Senator Bolkus progressed Australia's "Productive Diversity" policies which encourage awareness and deployment of the economic benefits of Australia's multicultural society.

Shadow Attorney-General and Minister for Justice

Nick Bolkus was the Shadow Attorney-General and Minister for Justice from 1996 to the 1998 Federal election.
He played a leading role in issues such as Constitutional change towards an Australian Republic, and access to Justice. He also carried the debate for the Opposition on the Wik Native Title legislation, the longest Committee debate in the Senate's history.

Shadow Minister for the Environment and Heritage

Bolkus was appointed to this portfolio after the 1998 election. He came to it after years of Ministerial involvement in environmental issues, including as Minister for Administrative Services, and through the establishment of an Environmental Futures team with the task of "Greening" the Government's construction, energy use and purchasing policies. As Shadow Minister he formulated policies to address Australia's major environmental challenges, including water, salinity and greenhouse gas emissions and carbon trading.

Parliamentary committee experience

Bolkus has served on and Chaired a number of Parliamentary Committees in the areas of Legal and Constitutional Affairs, Foreign Affairs, Industrial Relations, Corporation Legislation, Indigenous Affairs, and Human Rights 
He was Chairman of the Senate Standing Committee on Constitutional and Legal Affairs. 
He represented the Australian Parliament at the 1983 and 1984 Constitutional Conventions and at the 41st General Assembly of the United Nations in 1986.

Other issues
In 2003, Bolkus was accused and personally attacked by Workplace Relations Minister Tony Abbott for failing to declare donations made by Dante Tan. Tan was not found guilty of any criminal offence in either the Philippines or Australia. Abbott accused Bolkus of having breached the legal requirements of accepting a political donation. Abbott also accused Bolkus of money laundering, however it became clear that the matter was in fact not a breach of any regulations regarding political donations.

 Bolkus successfully sued Nationwide News for defamation in the District Court of South Australia in Bolkus v Nationwide News.

Post-Parliamentary Career

Lobbying 
Until 2015, Bolkus was a partner at Bespoke Approach, a corporate advisory firm. Bespoke Approach is now owned by corporate and political advisor Ian Smith and former Senior Vice-President at News Corporation Andrew Butcher.

Bolkus also offers political lobbying services under the names Kazaru and Nick Bolkus. Clients represented to the SA Parliament and SA government since 2016 include: SA Power Networks, Daycorp, D and R DeRuvo and sons, Fyfe, SSE Australia, Bedford Group, Walker Corporation, Lincoln Lakes Development Company, Kelaray Pty Ltd, Kangaroo Island Plantation Timbers Ltd, The Stehr Group, Tri-star Petroleum, Celsus/SA Health Partnership, Karadeniz Holdings, The Belgrave Group, RH & DJ Bichard Superfund.

Directorships and advisory positions 
Nick Bolkus is the Chairman of Directors of Nuturf Australia Pty Ltd,<ref></ref> and Envirogreen Pty Ltd. and Director of Wondertreat Aust Pty Ltd.and Ecofertiliser Pty Ltd.

He is Adviser to the Australian Hokkien Association.

He is also currently a Director of the industry based Australian Fisheries Academy.

References

1950 births
Australian people of Greek descent
Australian Labor Party members of the Parliament of Australia
Delegates to the Australian Constitutional Convention 1998
20th-century Australian politicians
Members of the Cabinet of Australia
Members of the Australian Senate
Members of the Australian Senate for South Australia
Adelaide Law School alumni
Living people
Australian lobbyists
Labor Left politicians
21st-century Australian politicians
Politicians from Adelaide
People educated at Adelaide High School